Nino Eller was an Italian stage and film actor.

Selected filmography
 Television (1931)
 The Phantom Gondola (1936)
 The Former Mattia Pascal (1937)
 Backstage (1939)

References

Bibliography 
 Waldman, Harry. Missing Reels: Lost Films of American and European Cinema. McFarland, 2000.

External links 
 

Year of birth unknown
Year of death unknown
Italian male film actors